Felix Frank (31 October 1876 in Vienna, then in Lower Austria as part of Austria-Hungary – 2 March 1957 in Innsbruck) was an Austrian politician from the Greater German People's Party who served as Vice-Chancellor of Austria from 31 May 1922 to 20 November 1924 under Chancellor Ignaz Seipel. From 1925 to 1932 he also served as Austrian ambassador to Germany.

References

External links
 Dr. Frank Felix - biography at Parliament of Austria website (original German)
 Dr. Felix Frank - Google Translate of biography at Parliament of Austria website from German to English

1876 births
1957 deaths
Vice-Chancellors of Austria
Greater German People's Party politicians
Politicians from Vienna
German nationalists